The blunt-snouted dolphin (Platalearostrum hoekmani, "Albert Hoekman's spoon-rostrum") is a prehistoric pilot whale known from a single specimen (NMR-9991-00005362), consisting of a partial rostrum, partial maxilla, partial premaxilla, and partial vomer. The fossil was discovered by Albert Hoekman on board a fishing trawler in the North Sea in 2008 and described in 2010 by Klaas Post and Erwin J.O. Kompanje. The blunt-snouted dolphin is believed to have had a balloonlike structure atop its rostrum and is estimated to have lived during the middle Pliocene to early Pleistocene.

References

Prehistoric toothed whales
Oceanic dolphins
Fossil taxa described in 2010
Pliocene cetaceans
Pliocene mammals of Europe
Pleistocene cetaceans
Pleistocene mammals of Europe